Vahitahi, or Vaitake, is an atoll in the eastern area of the Tuamotu Archipelago, French Polynesia.

Vahitahi is a small atoll with an elongated oval shape. Its reef encloses completely the lagoon.

The main village is called Mohitu (formerly Temanufaara). There were 105 inhabitants according to the 2012 census.

History
Vahitahi Atoll was the first land that Louis Antoine de Bougainville found in the Pacific in 1768. He called the atoll Les Quatre Facardins, after a novel of the time. James Cook reached Vahitahi the following year and named it Lagoon Island.

Vahitahi has a territorial airport. It was inaugurated in 1986.

Administration
Administratively Vahitahi Atoll belongs to the commune of Nukutavake.

References

Vahitahi Airport
Atoll names

External links
List of atolls (in French)

Atolls of the Tuamotus